The 1987 German motorcycle Grand Prix was the third round of the 1987 Grand Prix motorcycle racing season. It took place on the weekend of 15–17 May 1987 at the Hockenheimring.

500 cc classification

References

German motorcycle Grand Prix
German
Motorcycle
German motorcycle Grand Prix